Dave Bist is a Canadian journalist who covered the John Lennon, Yoko Ono Bed-In at the Queen Elizabeth Hotel in 1969 for the Montreal Gazette.

He earned a Juno Award in 1971 as "Canadian Journalist of the Year".

Bibliography
 1998: editor, Nick: a Montreal life  (a posthumous collection of writings by Nick Auf der Maur)

Quote
"All kinds of people came to pay their respects, from comedian-singer Tommy Smothers to Li'l Abner cartoonist Al Capp, who kind of betrayed the price of entry by getting into a shouting match with the Peaceful Pair."

References

Year of birth missing (living people)
Living people
Canadian male journalists
Juno Award winners
Montreal Gazette people